Patricia A. Eddington (born 1947/1948) served from 2001 through 2009 in the New York State Assembly, representing District 3 which comprises Patchogue, Medford, Coram and Yaphank, among other neighboring communities within Suffolk County, New York. She stepped down from the Assembly after winning an election for Town Clerk of Brookhaven, New York in November 2009.

Education and career
Eddington received an associate's degree in Women's Studies from Suffolk County Community College. She continued her education at SUNY Stony Brook, earning a bachelor's degree in Political Science and a master's degree from its School of Social Welfare. Eddington is licensed by New York State as a Clinical Social Worker.

She was a social worker for the Islip School District. Eddington served on the Patchogue-Medford Board of Education from 1980–1989, after which she served on the Patchogue-Medford Library Board.

Eddington was first elected to the state legislature in 2000, where she was Chairwoman of the Libraries and Education Technology Committee within the Assembly, in addition to serving as a member of the Health, Higher Education and Governmental Operations committees.

She currently serves as Town Clerk for Brookhaven, a position she was elected to in 2009. She is also an Associate Professor of Philosophy and Women's Studies at Suffolk County Community College.

Family
Eddington resides in Medford, New York. She is married to Suffolk County legislator Jack Eddington. They have two children, Kerri and Brian.

Election results
 November 2000 general election, NYS Assembly, 3rd AD
{| class="Wikitable"
| Patricia A. Eddington (DEM - IND - WOR) || ... || 21,366
|-
| Leah M. Jefferson (REP - CON - RTL) || ... || 20,730
|}

 November 2002 general election, NYS Assembly, 3rd AD
{| class="Wikitable"
| Patricia A. Eddington (DEM - IND - WOR) || ... || 14,222
|-
| Lee Snead (REP - CON - RTL) || ... || 13,141
|}

 November 2004 general election, NYS Assembly, 3rd AD
{| class="Wikitable"
| Patricia A. Eddington (DEM - IND - WOR) || ... || 29,360
|-
| Frederick Hall (REP - CON) || ... || 16,747
|}

 November 2006 general election, NYS Assembly, 3rd AD
{| class="Wikitable"
| Patricia A. Eddington (DEM - IND - WOR) || ... || 17,037
|-
| Scott J. Salimando (REP - CON) || ... || 9,819
|}

 November 2008 general election, NYS Assembly, 3rd AD
{| class="Wikitable"
| Patricia A. Eddington (DEM - IND - WOR) || ... || 30,334
|-
| Scott J. Salimando (REP - CON) || ... || 16,512
|}

References

External links
Patricia Eddington's Website

1940s births
Living people
Democratic Party members of the New York State Assembly
Women state legislators in New York (state)
Working Families Party politicians
Suffolk County Community College alumni
Stony Brook University alumni
People from Medford, New York
21st-century American women